Thadeu Marcos Orosco Coelho Lobo (born in Rio de Janeiro) is a Brazilian Rear Admiral, and current Commander of the Brazilian Submarine Force (ComForS)  and as of 16 December 2019, he replaced Luiz Carlos Roças Corrêa in the Command of the ComForS.

References

Living people
People from Rio de Janeiro (city)
Brazilian admirals
Year of birth missing (living people)